The Minister for Finance is a senior minister in the Government of Ireland. The Minister for Finance leads the Department of Finance and is responsible for all financial and monetary matters of the state; and is considered the second most important member of the Government of Ireland, after the Taoiseach.

The current office holder is Michael McGrath, TD.

Overview

The Minister for Finance holds the second most important ministerial position in the Irish Cabinet after that of the Taoiseach. He or she is in charge of the Department of Finance responsible for all financial matters in the Republic of Ireland. It is one of three positions in the government which the Constitution requires to be held by a member of Dáil Éireann, the other two being Taoiseach and Tánaiste. Many Ministers who have held the Finance portfolio have gone on to become Taoiseach, including Jack Lynch, Charles Haughey, Albert Reynolds, John Bruton, Bertie Ahern and Brian Cowen.

The department and minister are occasionally called the Irish Exchequer (or simply the Exchequer), a term previously used under the Chancellor of the Exchequer of Ireland.

Budget
One of the most important aspects of the Minister's work is the creation of the annual Budget which is announced to the Dáil in a speech, which must be delivered before 15 October due to the Two-Pack agreement. In the budget the Minister details the Government's spending programme for the coming year. The budget consists of:
a Financial Statement to the Dáil,
Budgetary Measures (a list of budgetary changes detailing the cost/yield of same),
Budget statistics, and
financial resolutions.

Minister for Finance since 1919

See also
National Lottery
Office of Public Works
Revenue Commissioners

References

External links
Department of Finance

Government ministers of the Republic of Ireland
Lists of government ministers of Ireland
Economy of the Republic of Ireland
 
Ireland, Finance
Minister